John Phillips Little House is a historic plantation house located near Little's Mills, Richmond County, North Carolina.  It was built between 1850 and 1855, and is a two-story, three bay, frame dwelling in the Greek Revival style.  It features a low hip roof and one-story porch supported by four fluted Doric order columns.  Also on the property are the contributing blacksmith's shop, the ruins of the cook's house, the site of the original kitchen, two small dove-tail plank structures, a 20th-century shed structure, and a large plank barn.

It was listed on the National Register of Historic Places in 1984.

References

Plantation houses in North Carolina
Houses on the National Register of Historic Places in North Carolina
Greek Revival houses in North Carolina
Houses completed in 1855
Houses in Randolph County, North Carolina
National Register of Historic Places in Richmond County, North Carolina